The Institut supérieur de management was the business school of the Versailles Saint-Quentin-en-Yvelines University. Created in 2010, the school was located in Guyancourt. In 2019, it joined the IAE's network and became the IAE Versailles.

References 

Versailles Saint-Quentin-en-Yvelines University
Education in Yvelines
Educational institutions established in 2010
2010 establishments in France